The 2015–16 Northwestern State Lady Demons basketball team represented Northwestern State University during the 2015–16 NCAA Division I women's basketball season. The Demons, led by fourth year co-head coaches Brooke Stoehr and Scott Stoehr, played their home games at Prather Coliseum and were members of the Southland Conference. They finished the season 19–12, 13–5 in Southland play to finish in third place. They lost in the semifinals of the Southland women's tournament to Sam Houston State. They were invited to the Women's Basketball Invitational where they lost in the first round to Louisiana–Lafayette.

On April 18, it was announced that the husband-wife coach, Brooke Stoehr & Scott Stoehr has resigned their positions and excepted the coaching job at Louisiana Tech. They finished at Northwestern State with a 4-year record of 71–58.

Roster

Media
Select Lady Demon basketball games can be listened to with a Northwestern feed at Demons Showcase. Many opponents have an audio stream available to listen to the games live that aren't done on Demons Showcase. NSU TV will also broadcast most of the Lady Demons wins tape delayed.

Schedule

|-
!colspan=9 style="background:#660099; color:#FFFFFF;"| Non-conference regular season

|-
!colspan=9 style="background:#660099; color:#FFFFFF;"| Southland Conference Schedule

|-
!colspan=9 style="background:#660099; color:#FFFFFF;"| Southland Women's Tournament

|-
!colspan=9 style="background:#660099; color:#FFFFFF;"| WBI

See also
2015–16 Northwestern State Demons basketball team

References

Northwestern State
Northwestern State Lady Demons basketball seasons
Northwestern State